Evanescent may refer to:

 Evanescent (dermatology), a class of skin lesions
 "Evanescent" (song), a song by Vamps
 Evanescent wave, a term applied to electromagnetic waves that decay exponentially

See also 
 Evanescence (disambiguation)